Adorable Arabella (German: Bezaubernde Arabella) is a 1959 West German comedy film directed by Axel von Ambesser and starring Johanna von Koczian, Carlos Thompson and Hilde Hildebrand. It is an adaptation of the 1949 novel Arabella by Georgette Heyer.

The film's sets were designed by the art directors Gottfried Will and Rolf Zehetbauer. It was shot using Agfacolor, with location shooting taking place around Coburg in Bavaria. It premiered just before Christmas 1959 in Cologne. The film was part of the production programme of the recently relaunched UFA company.

Synopsis
The story is set in the early years of the 20th century. A young German woman whose father has recently died is sent to visit her relatives in Edwardian England in the hope of attracting a wealthy husband.

Cast
 Johanna von Koczian as Arabella
 Carlos Thompson as Robert Beaumaris
 Hilde Hildebrand as Lady Bridlington
 Axel von Ambesser as Lord Fleetwood
 Peer Schmidt as Gordon Blair
 Hans Nielsen as Vater Hagemann
 Josef Meinrad as Sir Archibald Duncan
 Fritz Eckhardt as Hill, Bierbrauer
 Gregor von Rezzori as Sir Roderick Crawford
 Käthe Haack as Mutter Reger
 Christian Doermer as Helmut Hagemann
 Karin Himboldt as Harriet
 Ulla Moritz as Charlotte
 Michaela Heine as Elschen
 Alexander von Richthofen as Karl-Heinz
 Franz-Otto Krüger as Herr Schnering
 Emmy Burg as Frau Schnering
 Reinhold Pasch as Bill, Verwalter

References

Bibliography 
 Bock, Hans-Michael & Bergfelder, Tim. The Concise CineGraph. Encyclopedia of German Cinema. Berghahn Books, 2009.
 Goble, Alan. The Complete Index to Literary Sources in Film. Walter de Gruyter, 1999.

External links 
 

1959 films
West German films
German historical comedy films
1950s historical comedy films
1950s German-language films
Films directed by Axel von Ambesser
Films based on British novels
Films set in London
Films set in the 1900s
UFA GmbH films
1950s German films